Lukáš Matyska (born 26 April 1992) is a professional Czech football player currently playing for FC Zbrojovka Brno.

References
 
 Profile at FC Zbrojovka Brno official site

Czech footballers
1992 births
Living people
Czech First League players
FC Zbrojovka Brno players
Association football midfielders